Vashishtiputra Sātakarni (Brahmi: 𑀯𑀸𑀲𑀺𑀣𑀺𑀧𑀼𑀢 𑀲𑀸𑀢𑀓𑀁𑀁𑀡𑀺, Vāsiṭhiputa Sātakaṃṇi) was a Satavahana king, who ruled the Deccan region in India, during the 2nd century CE. He was the brother of Yajna Sri Satakarni, his regnal successor and Vasishthiputra Pulumavi, his regnal predecessor. His reign is dated 158-165 CE.

Vashishtiputra Sātakarni was in great conflict with the Scythian Western Kshatrapas in the West, but he eventually married the daughter of Rudradaman I of the Western Kshatrapas dynasty, in order to forge an alliance. The inscription relating the marriage between Rudradaman I's daughter and Vashishtiputra Satakarni appears in a cave at Kanheri:

Later, however, Vashishtiputra Sātakarni was defeated by his father-in-law in battle, with serious effect on Sātavāhana power and prestige:

Gallery

Notes

References 
 K.A. Nilakanta Sastri, A History of South India  (Madras, 1976).

2nd-century Indian monarchs
Vashishiputra